Cyphosoma is a genus of beetles in the family Buprestidae, containing the following species:

 Cyphosoma askenasyi Heyden, 1908
 Cyphosoma euphraticum (Gory & Laporte, 1839)
 Cyphosoma lawsoniae (Chevrolat, 1838)
 Cyphosoma paganettii Obenberger, 1914
 Cyphosoma tataricum (Pallas, 1773)
 Cyphosoma turcomanicum (Kraatz, 1883)
 Cyphosoma veselyi Obenberger, 1925

References

Buprestidae genera